Toveh Sorkhak or Toveh-ye Sorkhak, also rendered as Tuvehsorkhak or Tovahsorkhak or Tuh-e Sorkhak, may refer to:
 Toveh Sorkhak-e Nesar
 Toveh Sorkhak-e Olya
 Toveh Sorkhak-e Sofla